Edward 'Eddie' Randal Arnold (20 November 1949 – 2000) was a gymnast from Moston, Manchester, England, who participated in the Munich Olympics. He died in a climbing accident in 2000. Arnold attended Carnegie College 1969–1973, and then studied for a master's degree at Leeds University.

References

External links
British Men's Artistic Gymnastics Champions - Gymnastics History 

1949 births
2000 deaths
People from Moston, Manchester
Sportspeople from Manchester
British male artistic gymnasts
Olympic gymnasts of Great Britain
Gymnasts at the 1972 Summer Olympics
Commonwealth Games medallists in gymnastics
Commonwealth Games silver medallists for England
Gymnasts at the 1978 Commonwealth Games
British national champions
Alumni of the University of Leeds
Medallists at the 1978 Commonwealth Games